The Municipal Act, 2001 (the Act) is the main statute governing the creation, administration and government of municipalities in the Canadian province of Ontario, other than the City of Toronto. After being passed in 2001, it came into force on 1 January 2003, replacing the previous Municipal Act, 1990.

This act and others before as Municipal (Corporation) Act are linked back to Baldwin Act, 1849, which replaced the ineffective District Council Act by establishment of responsible government.

Functions

There are complex rules as to which municipalities have authority to act on any given subject, which are summarized as follows in Section 11:

See also 
 Revised Statutes of Ontario

References

External links
 Ministry of Municipal Affairs and Housing, Municipal Act e-guide

2001 in Ontario
Ontario provincial legislation
Local government in Ontario
2001 in Canadian law
Local government legislation